Okan Erdoğan (born 29 September 1998) is a German professional footballer who plays a centre-back for Süper Lig club İstanbulspor.

Career
Erdoğan made his professional debut for Preußen Münster in the 3. Liga on 31 July 2019, coming on as a substitute in the 66th minute for Nico Brandenburger in the 2–0 away loss against MSV Duisburg.

References

External links
 
 

Living people
1998 births
Footballers from Bremen
German footballers
Turkish footballers
German people of Turkish descent
Association football central defenders
VfB Oldenburg players
SC Preußen Münster players
İstanbulspor footballers
TFF First League players
3. Liga players
Regionalliga players
Süper Lig players